Isophrictis oudianella is a moth of the family Gelechiidae. It was described by Daniel Lucas in 1942. It is found in Tunisia.

References

Moths described in 1942
Isophrictis
Lepidoptera of North Africa